The Japanese Navy Signal Flags are a set of maritime signal flags for conveying messages in the Japanese language. The system generally uses the standard International Signal Flags, assigning both the letter, number and repeater flags to various kana, roughly following Iroha order for the standard letter flags. The system also has several unique flags for some kana, as well as for conveying non-alphabetic messages.

Maritime flags
Maritime signalling
Nonverbal communication
Optical communications
Signal flags
Encodings of Japanese